Potential Murder Suspects (P.M.S.) is the third and final album released by the Hard Boyz. It was released on March 24, 1998 through Roadrunner Records and was least successful of the group's three albums as it did not reach the Billboard charts.

Track listing
"Listen to 'em Rumors"- 3:18  
"Think About It"- 4:50 (Featuring MC Breed) 
"Thugz Like Us"- 4:57  
"Who Do You Fear"- 1:09  
"P.M.S."- 5:29 (Featuring Ghetto E) 
"Sick Psychotic Thoughts" (Remix)- 4:44  
"Hellbound"- 5:09  
"Here They Come"- 4:43  
"Trapped" (Remix)- 5:04 (Featuring Spice 1) 
"War Stories"- 3:21  
"I Now Know"- 4:22  
"Let's Roll"- 4:53  
"Lost Cause"- 4:45  
"Let's Straighten It Out"- 5:13

External links
[ Potential Murder Suspects] at Allmusic
Potential Murder Suspects at Tower Records
Potential Murder Suspects at Amazon.com

1998 albums
Hard Boyz albums